Alfonse Marcello D'Amato (born in Brooklyn, New York, on August 1, 1937) is a former United States Senator who represented the state of New York for 18 years from 1981 to 1999. He subsequently founded a lobbying firm, Park Strategies.

In 1980—after 25 years of involvement in the politics and government of Long Island—D'Amato defeated the four-term liberal Republican Sen. Jacob Javits for the Republican nomination for Senator and then in the general election for that office. D'Amato was re-elected in 1986 and 1992 before losing his fourth U.S. Senate election campaign to nine-term New York Congressman Chuck Schumer in 1998.

During his term as US Senator, he was known for supporting President Ronald Reagan on non-economic issues such as abortion. He agreed with President Bill Clinton both in 1993, for opening service in the armed forces to non-heterosexuals, and in 1996 for the Defense of Marriage Act, which denied federal recognition to same-sex marriages.

, D'Amato is the last Republican to have represented New York in the U.S. Senate.

Early life and family
D'Amato, of Italian ancestry, was born in Brooklyn and raised on Long Island, in the small village of Island Park. He is the son of Antoinette (Ciofarri) and Armand D'Amato, an insurance broker. He is a graduate of Chaminade High School, Syracuse University, and Syracuse University College of Law. At Syracuse University, he was a brother at Alpha Chi Rho fraternity.

D'Amato and his second wife Katuria have one son, Alfonso Marcello D'Amato, born in 2008, and a daughter, Luciana Cioffari D'Amato, born in 2009. D'Amato has four adult children from his first marriage.  Katuria D'Amato filed for divorce on 3 October 2017.

Early political career
Alfonse began his career in politics in Island Park (Long Island). He was involved heavily in the Unity Party of Island Park, the local political party that ran village elections in the small village of Island Park. He was then appointed the village attorney. Later, as a member of the Nassau County Republican Party, he was appointed Public Administrator of Nassau County, where he was responsible for managing the assets of county residents who died without wills. He was first appointed and then elected Receiver of Taxes of Hempstead, New York. He left this office to become a town supervisor in Hempstead and in 1977 he was elected presiding supervisor. He was also vice chairman of the Nassau County Board of Supervisors from 1977 to 1980.

Although a relatively obscure candidate, he defeated incumbent senator Jacob Javits by 56% to 44% in the 1980 Republican primary election, after Javits' 1979 diagnosis of amyotrophic lateral sclerosis. Javits nevertheless pursued the seat on the Liberal Party ticket, splitting the left-wing vote in ordinarily liberal New York with Democratic Congresswoman Elizabeth Holtzman and leading to D'Amato's 45% plurality victory. He was re-elected in 1986 and 1992, but lost in 1998 to liberal Democratic congressman Chuck Schumer, a future Senate Majority Leader.

U.S. Senate

D'Amato drew the nickname "Senator Pothole" for his delivery of "constituent services", helping citizens with their individual cases. While some New Yorkers meant the nickname as a pejorative, others saw it as a positive affirmation of his attention to getting things done.

He also holds the record for the second and eighth longest filibusters ever recorded in the United States Senate. He is remembered for his unique and rather comical filibusters. In 1986, in a filibuster against a military bill that lasted 23 1/2 hours, he read the District of Columbia telephone book. In 1992, D'Amato filibustered a bill that would have caused the loss of 750 jobs in upstate New York by singing "South of the Border (Down Mexico Way)".

He is also remembered for presenting a poster of a "Taxasaurus Rex", which he then stabbed with an oversized pencil.

D'Amato voted in favor of the bill establishing Martin Luther King Jr. Day as a federal holiday and the Civil Rights Restoration Act of 1987 (as well as to override President Reagan's veto). D'Amato voted in favor of the nominations of Robert Bork and Clarence Thomas to the U.S. Supreme Court.

He was a member of the President's Commission on Aviation Security and Terrorism (PCAST), which was set up in September 1989 to review and report on aviation security policy in light of the bombing of Pan Am Flight 103.

While he was in office, he was chair of the Senate Committee on Banking, Housing and Urban Affairs and was a member of the Senate Finance Committee. As a member of the former, he became a leading critic of the Clinton administration regarding the Whitewater scandal, and during 1995 and 1996 he chaired the hearings-heavy Senate Special Whitewater Committee. As a member of the latter, he championed the cause of Holocaust survivors trying to recover relatives' funds from accounts in Swiss banks.

D'Amato was influential in New York Republican politics and was considered the "boss" of the state party during his Senate years. For example, he played a leading role in recruiting George Pataki and in securing him the Republican nomination in the gubernatorial race of 1994.

D'Amato was known for being fairly conservative, a reflection of then-strongly conservative Nassau County and Long Island. He strongly supported the conservative positions of his party on "law and order" issues such as capital punishment and harsh penalties for drug offenses. On some issues, he agreed with the opposition: in 1993, D'Amato was one of only three Republicans to vote in favor of allowing gays to serve openly in the U.S. military. In 1996, he was among the minority of Republicans to vote for the Employment Non-Discrimination Act.

In 1998, the LGBTQ advocacy group Human Rights Campaign endorsed D'Amato for re-election over socially liberal Democratic Congressman Chuck Schumer. D'Amato, however, voted for the Defense of Marriage Act in 1996.

On labor issues too, he frequently sided with Democrats. His 54% to 44% loss in 1998 was attributed to a lack of support among moderate voters in New York City, the site of opponent Schumer's U.S. congressional district. His loss was also partially attributed to reports arising from D'Amato's use of the term "putzhead" (a Yiddish vulgarity) to refer to Schumer.

According to The New York Times, D'Amato was quite popular among his peers on Capitol Hill.

Later career

Columnist and analyst
Shortly before leaving office, D'Amato published his book of recollections, Power, Pasta and Politics. After retiring from politics in 1999, he became a regular columnist for George magazine until it ceased publication in 2001. He has also emerged as an analyst for Fox News. A notable on-air incident occurred when D'Amato took offense at comments of GOP strategist Jack Burkman. Saying he agreed with Burkman's suggestion that the Postal Service should be privatized; D'Amato slammed him for characterization of postal workers, which D'Amato said were offensively racist.

Poker Players Alliance 
D'Amato is chairman of the Poker Players Alliance, a nonprofit organization set up to help protect and fight for the rights of poker players in the United States. Part of their mission is to protect the right of poker players to play online.

He appeared on Howard Stern's Sirius-XM radio show on July 20, 2009, to promote the Poker Players Alliance.

Presidential elections

2008

On June 12, 2007, the former three-term Senator from New York endorsed one-time Senate colleague from Tennessee Fred Thompson for the Republican nomination for president in 2008.
In explaining his endorsement of Thompson, former Senator D'Amato called Thompson "a real conservative", not a candidate who adopted conservative positions in preparation for an election. D'Amato added, "Fred Thompson is the kind of candidate our party can unify behind and support wholeheartedly." On January 22, 2008, after poor showings from Thompson, D'Amato threw his support to John McCain for the 2008 presidential election, saying "If you want to win in November, John McCain is the man."

2012
On March 14, 2012, D'Amato endorsed Mitt Romney for president, saying "I am proud to endorse Governor Romney and support his candidacy for the Republican nomination for the Presidency. It is time for Republicans across the country to embrace Governor Romney and make him our nominee. Governor Romney is a successful businessman. He understands how our economy works and has a proven record of creating jobs. We need a man with his experience to take charge and lead our economy or we'll have four more years of the most liberal, tax and spend administration we have ever seen. I urge my fellow Republicans to unite behind Governor Romney and make him our nominee." He and Peter Kalikow appeared with Romney at fundraisers in New York leading up to the election.

2016
On August 26, 2015, D'Amato endorsed Ohio Governor John Kasich, over Jeb Bush and George Pataki. While stating that the Republican Party needs to move past the Bushes, he credited Pataki as a "wonderful guy", but cited Kasich's experience in balancing the budget as a congressman in the 1990s, and now in Ohio. Following Donald Trump's victory in the 2016 general election, D'Amato stated "I am in great spirits. I feel great for the people of our country." He urged Trump to appoint Rudy Giuliani as Attorney General, stating:"I think one great appointment and someone who will follow the law and not bend the law as he or she sees fit as the attorney general is Rudy Giuliani..."

COVID-19 
On November 20, 2020, D'Amato was hospitalized with COVID-19. Five days later, he was released from the hospital.

Electoral history

 1980 United States Senate election in New York
 Republican Primary
 Al D'Amato, 55.7%
 Jacob Javits (incumbent), 43.7%
 General election
 Al D'Amato (R), 44.9%
 Elizabeth Holtzman (D), 43.5%
 Jacob Javits (Lib.) (inc.), 11.1%
 1986 United States Senate election in New York
 Al D'Amato (R) (inc.), 53.0%
 Mark Green (D), 38.4%
 1992 United States Senate election in New York
 Al D'Amato (R) (inc.), 49.0%
 Robert Abrams (D), 47.8%
 1998 United States Senate election in New York
 Chuck Schumer (D), 54.6%
 Al D'Amato (R) (inc.), 44.1%

Screen appearances
D'Amato had a brief cameo as himself in the movie The Devil's Advocate (1997). D'Amato also made a brief cameo appearance as himself in an episode of Spin City.

See also

References

External links

 
 Dems target Al D'Amato
 Al D'Amato
 Biographical information

|-

|-

|-

|-

|-

|-

1937 births
American people of Italian descent
Chaminade High School alumni
Living people
New York (state) Republicans
Politicians from Nassau County, New York
People from Island Park, New York
Republican Party United States senators from New York (state)
Syracuse University alumni
Syracuse University College of Law alumni
Town supervisors in New York (state)
Whitewater controversy
Conservatism in the United States
Members of Congress who became lobbyists